Yu Feng-yun (born 24 January 1977) is a Taiwanese table tennis player. She competed in the women's doubles event at the 2000 Summer Olympics.

References

1977 births
Living people
Taiwanese female table tennis players
Olympic table tennis players of Taiwan
Table tennis players at the 2000 Summer Olympics
Place of birth missing (living people)